Hezemans is a surname. Notable people with the surname include:

Loris Hezemans (born 1997), Dutch racing driver
Mathieu Hezemans (1915–1985), Dutch racing driver and entrepreneur
Mike Hezemans (born 1969), Dutch racing driver
Toine Hezemans (born 1943), Dutch racing driver

de:Hezemans